Bemu, also Bemo Perak, is a small town on the southeastern coast of the Indonesian island of Seram, just to the south of Atiahu. It is one of the principal settlements on Teluti Bay.

References

Populated places in Seram Island